The 1968 Chicago Cubs season was the 97th season of the Chicago Cubs franchise, the 93rd in the National League and the 53rd at Wrigley Field. The Cubs finished third in the National League with a record of 84–78.

Offseason 
 November 28, 1967: Ramón Hernández was drafted by the Cubs from the Atlanta Braves in the 1967 rule 5 draft.
 November 30, 1967: Paul Popovich and Jim Williams were traded by the Cubs to the Los Angeles Dodgers for Lou Johnson.

Regular season

Season standings

Record vs. opponents

Notable transactions 
 May 4, 1968: Byron Browne was traded by the Cubs to the Houston Astros for Aaron Pointer.
 June 7, 1968: 1968 Major League Baseball draft
Oscar Gamble was drafted by the Cubs in the 16th round. Player signed June 18, 1968.
Paul Reuschel was drafted by the Cubs in the 4th round of the Secondary Phase. Player signed June 17, 1968.
 June 14, 1968: Ramón Hernández was purchased from the Cubs by the St. Louis Cardinals.

Roster

Player stats

Batting

Starters by position 
Note: Pos = Position; G = Games played; AB = At bats; H = Hits; Avg. = Batting average; HR = Home runs; RBI = Runs batted in

Other batters 
Note: G = Games played; AB = At bats; H = Hits; Avg. = Batting average; HR = Home runs; RBI = Runs batted in

Pitching

Starting pitchers 
Note: G = Games pitched; IP = Innings pitched; W = Wins; L = Losses; ERA = Earned run average; SO = Strikeouts

Other pitchers 
Note: G = Games pitched; IP = Innings pitched; W = Wins; L = Losses; ERA = Earned run average; SO = Strikeouts

Relief pitchers 
Note: G = Games pitched; W = Wins; L = Losses; SV = Saves; ERA = Earned run average; SO = Strikeouts

Farm system

Notes

References 

1968 Chicago Cubs season at Baseball Reference

Chicago Cubs seasons
Chicago Cubs season
Chicago Cubs